The Vikram Sarabhai Space Centre (VSSC) is a major space research centre of the Indian Space Research Organisation (ISRO), focusing on rocket and space vehicles for India's satellite programme. It is located in Thiruvananthapuram, in the Indian state of Kerala.

The centre had its beginnings as the Thumba Equatorial Rocket Launching Station (TERLS) in 1962. It was renamed in honour of Dr. Vikram Sarabhai, often regarded as the father of the Indian space program.  H.G.S. Murthy was appointed as the first director of Thumba Equatorial Rocket Launching Station.

The Vikram Sarabhai Space Centre is one of the main research and development establishments within ISRO. VSSC is an entirely indigenous facility working on the development of sounding rockets, the Rohini and Menaka launchers, and SLV, ASLV, PSLV, GSLV and GSLV Mk III families of launch vehicles.

History
The space centre is the largest among the ISRO facilities. It is a centre for the design and development of satellite launch vehicles and associated technologies. The centre pursues research and development in a host of distinct technology domains including aeronautics, avionics, and composites, primarily for the purpose of advancing the development of launch vehicle technology in India.

After incorporation of the Indian National Committee for Space Research (INCOSPAR) in 1962, its first act was the establishment of the Thumba Equatorial Rocket Launching Station (TERLS) at Thumba, in Thiruvananthapuram. Thumba was picked as the launch site for sounding rockets for meteorological and upper atmospheric research due to its location on the geomagnetic equator.  H.G.S. Murthy was appointed as the first director of Thumba Equatorial Rocket Launching Station.

21 November 1963 marked India's first venture into space, with the launch of a two-stage Nike Apache sounding rocket from TERLS. The first rockets launched were built in United States.

The first Indian designed and built rocket, RH-75, made its maiden flight on 20 November 1967. This was the 52nd launch of a sounding rocket from TERLS. It was flown twice again in 1967 and another 12 times in 1968, making a total of 15 RH-75 flights.

Among the sounding rockets to have flown from TERLS were Arcas-1, Arcas-11, Centaure-1, 11A and 11B, Dragon-1, Dual Hawk, Judy Dart, Menaka-1, Menaka-1Mk 1 and Mk11, Nike Tomahawk, M-100, Petrel, RH-100, RH-125, RH-200 (S), RH-300, variants of RH-560, etc. There have been a total of nearly 2200 sounding rocket launches from TERLS, so far.

Over the years VSSC has designed, developed and since 1965 started launching a family of sounding rockets under the generic name, Rohini Sounding Rockets (RSR) to serve a range of scientific missions. The currently operational Rohini Sounding Rockets are RH-200, RH-300, RH-560 and their different versions. These sounding rockets are launched for carrying out research in areas like meteorology and upper atmospheric processes up to an altitude of about 500 km.

TERLS was formally dedicated to the United Nations on 2 February 1968, by then Prime Minister of India, Mrs. Indira Gandhi. Although no direct funding from the UN was involved, scientists from several countries including United States, Russia (former USSR), France, Japan, Germany and UK continue to utilize the TERLS facility for conducting rocket based experiments. Over 1161 USSR meteorological sounding rockets called M-100 were launched from TERLS every week from 1970 until 1993.

After the sudden demise of Dr. Vikram Sarabhai on 30 December 1971, TERLS and associated space establishments at Thiruvananthapuram were renamed as the Vikram Sarabhai Space Centre in his honour.

In the early 1980s, VSSC was instrumental in the development of India's Satellite Launch Vehicle program, SLV-3. This was followed in the late 1980s with the Augmented Satellite Launch Vehicle (ASLV), for launching 150 kg satellites into near earth orbits.

In the 1990s, VSSC contributed to the development of India's workhorse launch vehicle, the Polar Satellite Launch Vehicle (PSLV).

Facilities
In addition to its main campus located at Thumba and Veli, VSSC has integration and checkout facilities located at Valiamala. Facilities for development of reinforced plastics and composites are located at Vattiyoorkavu in Thiruvananthapuram City. The ISRO plant in Aluva produces ammonium perchlorate, a vital ingredient for solid propellant motors. Thumba Equatorial Rocket Launching Station (TERLS) and the Space Physics Laboratory (SPL) are also within the VSSC campus. SPL focuses on research activities in disciplines such as atmospheric boundary layer physics, numerical atmospheric modeling, atmospheric aerosols, atmospheric chemistry, trace gases, atmospheric dynamics, thermospheric-ionospheric physics, planetary sciences, etc.

Satish Dhawan Supercomputing Facility.

VSSC has a large workforce of about 4500 employees, most of them specialists in frontier disciplines.

Programs
Over the last four decades VSSC has become the leading centre for development of launch vehicle technology.

VSSC has a matrix organization based on Projects and Entities. Core project teams manage project activities. System level activities of the projects are carried out by system development agencies. Major programmes of VSSC include the Polar Satellite Launch Vehicle (PSLV), Geosynchronous Satellite Launch Vehicle (GSLV), Rohini Sounding Rockets, Space Capsule Recovery Experiment, Reusable Launch Vehicles and Air Breathing Propulsion.

VSSC pursues research and development in the fields of aeronautics, avionics, composites, computer and information technology, control guidance and simulation, launch vehicle design, mechanical engineering, mechanisms vehicle integration and testing, propellants polymers and materials, propulsion propellants and space ordnance, and systems reliability. These research Entities are the system development agencies for the Projects and thus provide for the realization of the project objectives. Management systems area provides for programme planning and evaluation, human resource development, budget and manpower, technology transfer, documentation and outreach activities.

VSSC is certified for compliance to ISO 9001:2000 quality management system. The quality objectives of the centre are planning, implementing and maintaining a quality system during design, development, production, and operation of subsystems and systems for launch vehicles. It also aims at achieving continued improvement in process for its zero defect goal.

ISRO has developed an array of sounding rockets and four generations of launch vehicles and thus establishing operational space transportation system. Most of launch vehicle development is carried out at VSSC.

Current focus of VSSC is on the Geosynchronous Satellite Launch Vehicle (GSLV), the GSLV Mk III and the Reusable Launch Vehicle- Technology Demonstrator (RLV-TD).

In January 2007, the Space Capsule Recovery Experiment Module (SRE-1) was safely brought back to earth after 10 days in orbit. This involved a host of technologies developed at VSSC, including thermal protection systems to withstand the large heat flux of atmospheric re-entry.

VSSC made significant contribution to India's maiden mission to the Moon, Chandrayaan-1.

VSSC R&D efforts have included solid propellant formulations. Another focus area has been navigation systems; the ISRO Inertial Systems Unit (IISU) established at Vattiyoorkavu is a part of VSSC.

VSSC is involved in the development of air-breathing vehicles. A reusable launch vehicle technology demonstrator is under development, which will be tested soon.

VSSC also has programs focused on applications of space technology including village resource centres, telemedicine, tele-education, disaster management support and outreach through Direct To Home television broadcast.

Former directors

See also
 Swami Vivekananda Planetarium

References

Space programme of India
Organisations based in Thiruvananthapuram
Buildings and structures in Thiruvananthapuram
Research institutes in Thiruvananthapuram
Space technology research institutes
1963 establishments in Kerala
Research institutes established in 1963